The American Journal of Clinical Dermatology (Am J Clin Dermatol) is a bimonthly peer-reviewed medical journal published by Springer Nature. The American Journal of Clinical Dermatology promotes evidence-based therapy and effective patient management within the discipline of dermatology by publishing critical and comprehensive review articles and clinically focussed original research articles covering all aspects of the management of dermatological conditions. The editor-in-chief is Kathy Fraser.

The journal is included in Index Medicus (MEDLINE) and EMBASE.

According to the Journal Citation Reports, the journal has a 2021 impact factor of 6.233.

References

External links

Dermatology journals
Springer Science+Business Media academic journals
Publications established in 2000
Bimonthly journals